Turag is a rural locality (a selo) and the administrative centre of Turagsky Selsoviet, Tabasaransky District, Republic of Dagestan, Russia. The population was 1,164 as of 2010. There are 8 streets.

Geography 
Turag is located 17 km south of Khuchni (the district's administrative centre) by road. Zirdag and Sika are the nearest rural localities.

References 

Rural localities in Tabasaransky District